= Crown Ground =

Football stadium in Accrington, Lancashire, England

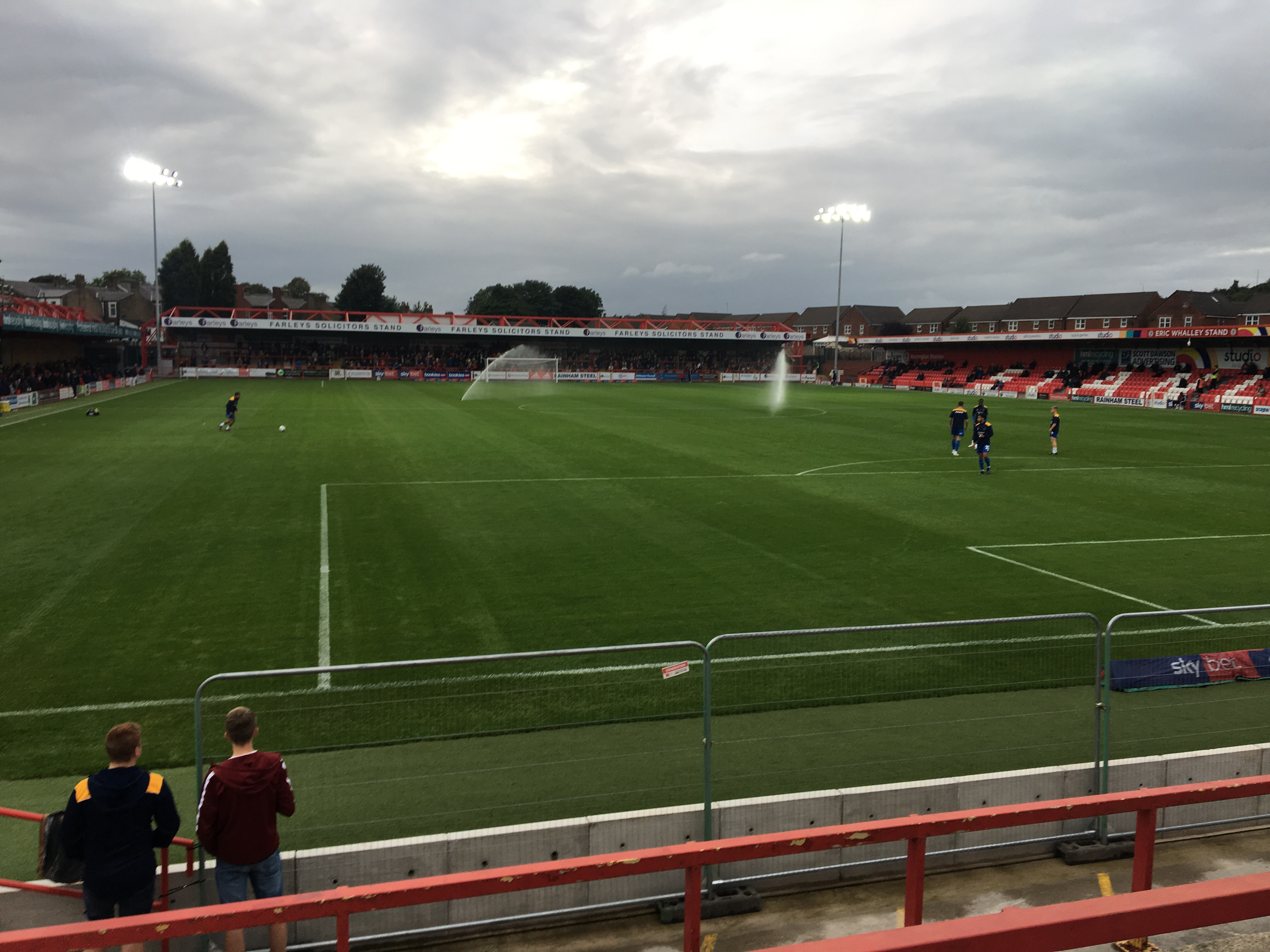

- Location in Hyndburn
- Former names: Fraser Eagle Stadium; Interlink Express Stadium
- Location: Livingstone Road, Accrington, Lancashire, England
- Coordinates: 53°45′55″N 2°22′15″W
- Elevation: 516 feet (157 m)
- Capacity: 5,450 (3,100 seated)
- Record attendance: 5,397
- Field size: 111 by 72 yards (101 m × 66 m)

Construction
- Built: 1968
- Opened: 1968

Tenant
- Accrington Stanley F.C. (1968–present)

The Crown Ground (known as Wham Stadium as part of a sponsorship deal with What More UK) is a multi-use stadium in Accrington, Lancashire, England. It is currently used mostly for football matches and is the home ground of Accrington Stanley. Opened in 1968, the stadium has a capacity of 5,450.

== Stands/terraces ==
- Jack Barret Memorial Stand: this stand is the newest stand. Running half the length of the pitch, it replaced a terrace whilst Stanley were still in the Northern Premier League. The dugouts are situated here and in the John Smiths Stand.
- Clayton End: officially called the Sophia Khan Stand. This the home end. The more vocal Stanley fans known as the Stanley Ultras like to stand here. It is a covered terrace that had a roof added to it at the start of 2007–08. Seats were added to the front half of the terrace to bring the stadium up to Football League standards.
- Whinney Hill Terrace: otherwise known as the Cowshed. It stands on the lower slopes of Whinney Hill which is home to a vast waste infill site. It was a small terrace with only 3 rows but had seating installed in the covered section to bring the stadium up to Football League standards. It has a roof running two-thirds of the length of the pitch held up by pillars. The terrace continues around the corner for about a third of the Coppice End and around the corner at the other end to join with the Clayton End. The television gantry is situated in the middle of the terrace. The half nearest the Coppice End is given to away fans. This stand was replaced by the 1,100 seater Eric Whalley Stand, which opened in 2019
- Coppice End: This is the away end and has the ability to accommodate up 1,800 supporters. If additional demand is required then part of the Whinney Hill side is used for this allocation. Conversely, if away demand is small this stand can go unused. This end is uncovered and is very exposed to the weather.

== Record attendance ==
A record attendance of 4,801 was set on 17 November 2018 for a League One match against Barnsley, but only stood for three weeks, when it was bettered by a crowd of 5,257 for another league match against Sunderland on 8 December 2018, although the match was abandoned due to a waterlogged pitch. A new record of 5,397 was set on 26 January 2019 when Derby County visited in the FA Cup fourth round.
